Aerial Visions is the eighth studio album by guitarist Vinnie Moore, released on October 23, 2015 independently through Mind's Eye Music.

Track listing

Personnel
Vinnie Moore – guitar, bass
Tim Lehner – keyboard
Richie Monica – drums
Dave LaRue – bass
Rob De Luca – bass
Dorian Heartsong – bass
Elliott Dean Rubinson – bass
Joey DeMaio – engineering
Paul Northfield – mixing
Paul Logus – mastering

References

External links
Aerial Visions Review at Ultimate Guitar

Vinnie Moore albums
2015 albums